The United States Karate Association (USKA) was the first karate organization on the mainland United States, founded by Robert Trias in 1948.

The USKA became one of the largest associations of karate instructors in the nation, and through this organization Trias was also instrumental in setting up and promoting some of the first karate tournaments in the US in 1955, as well as national and worldwide competitions. The USKA rules for tournament competition are still used today in the United States with only slight variation.

At its height the USKA had more than a half-million members worldwide and conducted an annual national championship competition in the United States. This competition was called the USKA National Championship in 1966 and became the USKA Grand National Championship in 1968. 
 
Trias died in 1989 of cancer, leaving the Shuri-ryu system to his daughter Roberta Trias-Kelley and precipitating a struggle for succession within the USKA.   Both John Pachivas, regional USKA director for the Southeastern US, and George E. Anderson (1931-2009), president of the United States Amateur Karate Federation, produced documents naming themselves as Trias' successor.  However, Trias-Kelley dissolved the organization in 1999, thus ending the strife.

References

External links
Martial Arts Books

Karate organizations
Karate in the United States
Traditional karate
1948 establishments in the United States
1999 disestablishments in Arizona
Sports organizations established in 1948
Organizations disestablished in 1999